Charles Burr may refer to:

 Charles Chauncey Burr (1817–1883), American journalist, author, and publisher
 Charles E. Burr (1934–2008), American Champion Thoroughbred horse racing jockey